Richmond Township is the name of some places in the U.S. state of Pennsylvania:

Richmond Township, Berks County, Pennsylvania
Richmond Township, Crawford County, Pennsylvania
Richmond Township, Tioga County, Pennsylvania

Pennsylvania township disambiguation pages